Makoto Fujimura is an American artist. He is considered to be one of the leading figures of "slow art" movement. He has coined the terms "Culture Care" and "Theology of Making". He graduated with a Bachelor of Arts degree from Bucknell University, then studied in a traditional Japanese painting doctorate program for several years at Tokyo University of the Arts with several notable artists such as Takashi Murakami and Hiroshi Senju. His bicultural arts education led his style towards a fusion between fine art and abstract expressionism, together with the traditional Japanese art of Nihonga and Kacho-ga (bird-and-flower painting tradition).

Biography

Early life 
Fujimura was born in Boston, Massachusetts. Both of his parents were of Japanese descent and after Fujimura was born, they returned to Japan, where Fujimura spent most of his childhood. When he was 13 years old, his family came back to the United States.

Education 
Fujimura graduated cum laude from Bucknell University in 1983 with a double major in animal behavior and art and a minor in creative writing. Fujimura went on to study traditional Japanese painting at the Tokyo University of the Arts under a Nihonga Master Kazuho Hieda. He received his Master of Fine Arts degree in 1989. He was invited back to the Tokyo University of the Arts to continue his education in a lineage doctoral-level program in Nihonga, an ancient Japanese painting style, under a Nihonga Master Matazo Kayama. He was the first non-Japanese citizen to be accepted in the Japanese painting doctorate program, which dates back to the 15th century.

Work

Paintings 

Fujimura's paintings are a combination of the traditional Japanese painting style known as Nihonga and abstract expressionism. Throughout the 1990s Fujimura exhibited his paintings in both Japan and the US. In 1992, at the age of 32, Fujimura became the youngest artist ever to have a piece acquired by the Museum of Contemporary Art in Tokyo.

Exhibitions 

In 2011 the Fujimura Institute was established and launched the Qu4rtets, a collaboration between Fujimura, painter Bruce Herman, Duke theologian/pianist Jeremy Begbie, and Yale composer Christopher Theofanidis, based on T. S. Eliot's Four Quartets. The exhibition travelled to Baylor University, Duke University, and Yale University, Hong Kong University, Cambridge University, Gordon College, Roanoke College and other institutions around the globe. Qu4rtets became the first contemporary art exhibited at the historic King's Chapel in Cambridge, UK, for the Easter of 2015, and was exhibited in Hiroshima for the 70th anniversary of the atomic bombings in November 2015.

He is represented by Artrue International and other galleries internationally. His works are in permanent collection at the National Modern Museum of Art in Tokyo, Yokohama Museum of Art, Tokyo University of the Arts Museum, the Saint Louis Museum, the Cincinnati Museum, and the CNN building in Hong Kong, and other museums globally. Tikotin Museum in Israel hosted a solo exhibit in 2018 curated by James Elaine.

His work includes "Ki-seki", "Water Flames", "Walking on Water", "Silence", "Columbines", and "Golden Sea", a collection of paintings using stone-ground minerals, including gold, platinum, silver, azurite, malachite and cinnabar. He has collaborated with Susie Ibarra on multiple occasions, and his live painting was recorded by Plywood Pictures in "Live in New York: Susie Ibarra + Makoto Fujimura" (2009).

In November 2009, Fujimura's works were coupled with works of Georges Rouault at Dillon Gallery. Fujimura created several new works in homage to the 20th-century master, the catalyst of the "Sacred Arts Movement" in Paris that influenced Picasso, Matisse and other modernist artists. Fujimura wrote an essay for the show that was included in a short book that was produced to accompany the show called "Soliloquies" (Square Halo Books, 2009). His "Twin Rivers of Tamagawa" (Collection of Tokyo University of Art Museum) was included in the recent Panasonic Museum exhibit "Rouault and Japan".

Crossway Publishing commissioned Fujimura in 2009 for The Four Holy Gospels project to commemorate the 400th anniversary of the publishing of the King James Bible. It was the first time that a single artist has been commissioned to illuminate the four Gospels in nearly five hundred years. The Gospels were on exhibition at the Museum of Biblical Art in Manhattan in 2011, and are on display in Takashimaya, Nihonbashi, Tokyo, until December, 2011. The Four Holy Gospels consist of five major frontispieces, 89 chapter heading letters and over 140 pages of hand illumined pages, all done in traditional Nihonga. The Four Holy Gospels original art will be featured in "Four Holy Gospels Chapel" at the Museum of the Bible in Washington, DC.

Published writings 
He is also an author of several books including Refractions: A Journey of Faith, Art and Culture (NavPress, 2009) and Culture Care (Fujimura Institute, 2014). In 2016, Fujimura released Silence and Beauty: Hidden Faith Born of Suffering (IVPress), an autobiographical journey into Shūsaku Endō's Silence. His recent book Art+Faith: A Theology of Making (Yale U. Press, 2021) was released on January 5, 2021.
 Art+Faith: A Theology of Making (Yale University Press, 2021) (foreword by N. T. Wright)
 Silence and Beauty Aldersgate Award Winner (IVPress, 2016, Sho-Bunsha in Japan, 2017)
 Culture Care (Fujimura Institute, 2014, republished by IVPress, 2017)
 "The Aroma of the New" (Books & Culture, 2011)
 "Fallen Towers and the Art of Tea" (2009)
 Refractions: A Journey of Art, Faith and Culture (NavPress, 2009)
 "Withoutside: Transgressing in Love", Image Journal, "Twentieth Anniversary Issue: Fully Human," Number 60 (2008)
 "A Letter to a Young Artist", Scribbling in the Sand, Michael Card, InterVarsity Press (2002)
 "Fallen Towers and the Art of Tea", Image Journal, Number 32 (2001)
 "An Exception to Gravity – On Life and Art of Jackson Pollock", Regeneration Quarterly, Volume 7, Number 3 (2001)
 "River Grace", Image Journal, Number 22 (1999)
 "That Final Dance", It Was Good: Making Art to the Glory of God, edited by Ned Bustard, Square Halo Press (2000)

Film 
Fujimura served as a special advisor to the major motion picture by Martin Scorsese based on Endō's Silence.

In 2010 Fujimura made his on-screen debut with commentary in the award-winning documentary, The Human Experience.  His mid-career retrospective catalogue Golden Sea (Dillon Gallery Press) was released in 2013 with essays by Daniel Siedell, Roberta Ahmanson, Nicolas Wolterstorff, and others.  Golden Sea includes a full documentary of the same title by Plywood Pictures. Fujimura has recently served as an executive producer of a short film Abstraction: Dianne Collard Story, a finalist at the Heartland Film Festival]. With his wife Haejin Shim Fujimura, Fujimura's are executive producers of a film "New Creation" (tentative title by Windrider Production) which depicts www.embersinternational.org work in India of building a school for children born in the brothels.

Career 

From September 2015 to January 2020, Fujimura was the Vision Director of the Brehm Center for Worship, Theology, and the Arts at Fuller Theological Seminary.

Fujimura founded the International Arts Movement in 1991. He has co-hosted several major conferences for the International Arts Movement, and continues to develop the gathering through Culture Care Summit (February 8–12, 2017, at Fuller).

He has lectured at The Aspen Institute, Hong Kong University, Bucknell University, Cairn University, Gordon College, Grove City College, The King's College, Princeton University, Yale University, and has been a keynote speaker in various arts, academic and business conferences.

Recognition

Fujimura is a recipient of 2014 American Academy of Religion's Religion and Arts Award. He is also a senior fellow at the Trinity Forum.

Fujimura received 2016 Aldersgate Prize, which "celebrates the outstanding achievement of an author whose scholarly inquiry challenges reductionistic trends in academia by yielding a broad, integrative analysis of life's complexities and shedding fresh light on ultimate questions that enliven Christian conceptions of human flourishing", for his Silence and Beauty book on Shūsaku Endō. Fujimura was a special advisor for Martin Scorsese on Silence production.  Fujimura Institute brought collaborative exhibit at Shusaku Endo Literature Museum in Sotome, Nagasaki, in August 2017.

Bucknell University honored him with the Outstanding Alumni Award in 2012.

Fujimura is a recipient of four Doctor of Arts honorary degrees, from Belhaven University in 2011, Biola University in 2012, Cairn University in 2014, and Roanoke College in 2015. He has given over five Commencement Addresses, including Judson University address "Kintsugi Generation". His 2011 Commencement Address at Belhaven University has been selected by NPR as "Top 200 Commencement Addresses Ever", and in 2021 by CNN as one of 16 top addresses, "From Obama to Steve Jobs: The greatest commencement speeches of all time".

Fujimura was appointed by the U.S. President George W. Bush to the National Council on the Arts in 2003. At the completion of his term in 2009, then Chair Dana Gioia awarded him the Chairman's Medal for his service and contribution to arts advocacy in the United States.

Personal
Fujimura is the son of Osamu Fujimura, one of the pioneers of speech science.

Fujimura's journey of faith is recounted in his book Silence and Beauty. When he was in Japan studying traditional methods in Japanese art, Fujimura at this point of his life was searching for a deeper meaning and purpose in life but he did not find satisfaction, thinking the Bible's teachings were not applicable for the modern world. It was not until he read the poems of William Blake, where he found new meaning in Christianity and began his journey of his newfound faith. Since then, he has intertwined his artwork with his faith. Afterwards, he wanted to help other artists and creative people alike who struggle with their art and faith and it became the organization called the International Arts Movement, now IAMCultureCare.

Fujimura is married to Haejin Shim Fujimura, a lawyer, entrepreneur, and nonprofit leader. She is the managing partner of Shim & Associates, P.C., co-founder and CEO of Embers International, Inc., and President of Academy Kintsugi. The Fujimuras work together for an international movement of "Beauty+Justice" and "Kintsugi-Peace Making".

References 

June 23, Shane Blackshear on; 2016. "Seminary Dropout 130: Makoto Fujimura, Author of Silence and Beauty: Hidden Faith Born of Suffering". Missio Alliance. Retrieved 2019-03-05.

"Makoto Fujimura | Bio". www.makotofujimura.com. Retrieved 2019-03-05.

Risdon, Nate. "Faculty & Staff". Brehm Center. Retrieved 2019-03-05.

"Makoto Fujimura". Image Journal. Retrieved 2019-03-05.

"Makoto Fujimura Awarded 2016 Aldersgate Prize for "Silence and Beauty"". www.indwes.edu. Retrieved 2019-03-05.

Forum, The Trinity (2015-06-02), Evening Conversation with Makoto Fujimura, retrieved 2019-03-05

Glaspey, Terry. 75 Masterpieces Every Christian Should Know. Baker Books, 2015.

External links
 

1960 births
Living people
20th-century American painters
American male painters
21st-century American painters
American artists of Japanese descent
Christian artists
20th-century American male artists